This is a list of the governors of Tripura, a state in northeast India, since its inception as a state on 21 January 1972.

Powers and functions

The governor enjoys many different types of powers:

Executive powers related to administration, appointments and removals,
Legislative powers related to lawmaking and the state legislature, that is Vidhan Sabha or Vidhan Parishad, and
Discretionary powers to be carried out according to the discretion of the governor.

Governors of Tripura

See also
 Tripura
 Governors of India

References

 
Tripura
Governors